Burias Island is one of the three major islands of Masbate province in the Philippines. It is separated from the Bicol Peninsula by the Burias Pass. The other two major islands are Ticao Island and Masbate Island. The Island has two municipalities, Claveria and San Pascual.

References

Islands of Masbate